Camilo Lucas Nvo Engonga (born 30 March 1986), known as Papa, is a retired Equatoguinean footballer, who played as a midfielder.

Career
Camilo began his career in one of the most popular clubs of his natal city, CD Elá Nguema, club that belongs to the Equatoguinean Premier League. Then he was in two teams of minor relevancy in Malabo, Rayo Lasser and CD Cultural (the latter club represents to the Centro Cultural Hispano-Guineano). Later, he was transferred to Atlético Malabo, turning thus to the most important level of the Equatoguinean football. Because he had been good there, Camilo went out of Equatorial Guinea to sign, in December 2008, for the Spanish club AD Cartaya in the Tercera División. Cándido Rosado was his head coach there, who later passed to be head coach to Ayamonte CF, deciding to sign Camilo in the latter club for the following season.

International career
Camilo was an Equatoguinean full international footballer in a friendly match against Benin on 26 February 2006. He already had taken part of youth national teams, both U17 and U21.
He was called to represent the Equatoguinean team at the 2006 Lusophony Games but, when the games began, Equatorial Guinea didn't send any athletes.

Personal
As of 2009 he's studying Business at the University of Huelva.

References

External links
Camilo at AyamonteCF.com
Camilo at LaPreferente.com

1986 births
Living people
Sportspeople from Malabo
Equatoguinean footballers
Association football midfielders
CD Elá Nguema players
Tercera División players
Divisiones Regionales de Fútbol players
Equatoguinean expatriate footballers
Equatoguinean expatriate sportspeople in Spain
Expatriate footballers in Spain